Lutrogale was proposed as generic name by John Edward Gray in 1865 for otters with a convex forehead and nose, using the smooth-coated otter L. perspicillata as type species.

The genus also contains the following extinct and fossil species:
L. cretensis – Cretan otter
L. palaeoleptonyx
L. robusta

References

Otters
Mammal genera
Mammal genera with one living species
Taxa named by John Edward Gray